The World RX of Turkey is a rallycross event held in Turkey for the FIA World Rallycross Championship. The event made its debut in the 2014 season, at the Istanbul Park rallycross circuit in Tuzla, near Istanbul.

Past winners

References

External links

Turkey
Auto races in Turkey